Tårup is a village in central Denmark, located in Nyborg municipality on the island of Funen in Region of Southern Denmark.

History
Tårup was first mentioned in 1361 as Thorpe. The name comes from the Danish word 'torp', translating to a settlement with a population from another village - in this case Frørup. Through the Middle Ages most of Tårup was owned by the crown.

Tårup Church
Tårup Church is located in Tårup, and was built in 1883 by Jens Eckersberg. The church's current organ is from 2001. A model ship was bought during the church's 100-year anniversary in 1983. The ship is a model of a ship that sailed in the Great Belt Strait when the church was built in 1883. The two bells in the church are from the Netherlands and were built in 1972.

References

Cities and towns in the Region of Southern Denmark
Populated places in Funen
Nyborg Municipality
Villages in Denmark